Millipore may refer to:

Millipore Corporation, a biosciences company
Millipore filter, a nucleopore filter, nitrocellulose or polycarbonate membrane filter with a pore size 0.2 μm up to 20 µm
Millipore chamber, or Millipore Diffusion chamber, a round-shaped chamber widely used for in vivo research, sealed at each end with a cellulose cell-impenetrable filter to permit the growth of transplanted cells or tissue, while allowing nutrients through